Dr. Chopper is a 2005 American horror film directed by Lewis Schoenbrun. The plot centers on five young friends who, while heading for vacation at a family cabin, encounter a notorious motorcycle-riding serial killer Dr. Fielding (Ed Brigadier) and his two cannibalistic female assistants, who murder and dismember people in search of body parts which Dr. Chopper uses as replacements for his own in order to extend his life.

Cast

 Ed Brigadier as Dr. Fielding / Dr. Chopper
 Chelsey Crisp as Jessica
 Costas Mandylor as Terrell
 Robert Adamson as Nick
 Chase Hoyt as Reese
 Ashley McCarthy as Tamara
 Benjamin Keepers as Robert
 Elisa Schuyler as Melanie
 Rose Swim as Leslie
 Thomas Carlton as Detective Tubman

Reception
The film received very negative reviews.

The film does have some form of a cultish fanbase, internet film critic Danny Price for Icons of Fright cites it as one of his favourite B-Movies of all time in the Schlock Value column of Icons of Fright, his comments are made in the columns debut edition in December 2007. 
Matt McAllister of Total Sci-Fi gave it 2/10 and called it an "Inept slasher with little to offer even the least discerning horror fan."

References

External links
 

American teen horror films
American independent films
2005 horror films
2005 films
Films about cannibalism
American slasher films
Films directed by Lewis Schoenbrun
2000s English-language films
2000s American films